Colby is a city in and the county seat of Thomas County, Kansas, United States.  As of the 2020 census, the population of the city was 5,570.

History
In 1882, a post office was established near the center of Thomas County. Area homesteaders lived under harsh conditions in sod houses, creating demand for a town to provide lumber and other provisions to incoming settlers. J.R. Colby, a local land assessor and preacher, obtained a patent to establish the town in April 1884, and land was acquired for the town site three miles north of the post office in March 1885. The following month, the Kansas Secretary of State issued the Town Charter. Kansas Gov. John Martin named Colby the county seat in 1885, and the city was incorporated in 1886. The Union Pacific Railroad reached the city in 1887, and the Rock Island Railroad followed the next year.

In 1941 the St. Thomas Hospital was built as part of the Works Progress Administration plan to build hospitals. This was one of 130 new hospitals to be built with these funds, it was one of two built in Kansas alone. Within the last couple of years, it was renovated to apartments under the name St. Thomas Historic Residences.

 
Interstate 70 reached Colby in 1965, stimulating the growth of a local hospitality industry.

Geography
It lies on the south side of Prairie Dog Creek, a tributary of the Republican River, in the High Plains region of the Great Plains. A small tributary of the creek flows northeast through the town.

Climate
Colby has a transitional climate between a humid continental climate (Köppen Dfa) and a semiarid climate (Köppen BSk)  with hot summers and cold, dry winters. The average temperature in Colby is 50 °F (10 °C), and the average relative humidity is 61%. The high temperature reaches or exceeds  an average of 50 days a year and reaches or exceeds  an average of 6.5 days a year. The minimum temperature falls below the freezing point  an average of 166.5 days a year. Typically, the first fall freeze occurs between mid-September and the second week of October, and the last spring freeze occurs between the fourth week of April and the third week of May. There are, on average, 72 days of measurable precipitation each year. Measurable snowfall occurs an average of 70 days a year with at least an inch of snow being received on nine of those days. Snow depth of at least an inch occurs an average of 31 days a year. Typically, January is the coldest month, and July is both the hottest and wettest month. The hottest temperature recorded in Colby was 113 °F (45 °C) in 2012; the coldest temperature recorded was -32 °F (-36 °C) in 1989.

Demographics

2010 census
As of the census of 2010, there were 5,387 people, 2,211 households, and 1,320 families residing in the city. The racial makeup of the city was 95.7% White, 0.7% African American, 0.4% Native American, 0.6% Asian, 0.1% Pacific Islander, 1.3% from other races, and 1.2% from two or more races. Hispanic or Latino of any race were 4.0% of the population.

There were 2,211 households, of which 28.6% had children under the age of 18 living with them, 46.0% were married couples living together, 9.2% had a female householder with no husband present, 4.5% had a male householder with no wife present, and 40.3% were non-families. 33.2% of all households were made up of individuals, and 12.2% had someone living alone who was 65 years of age or older. The average household size was 2.28 and the average family size was 2.89.

The median age in the city was 34.5 years. 22.2% of residents were under the age of 18; 16.3% were between the ages of 18 and 24; 21.5% were from 25 to 44; 24.2% were from 45 to 64; and 15.7% were 65 years of age or older. The gender makeup of the city was 48.0% male and 52.0% female.

2000 census
As of the census of 2000, there were 5,450 people, 2,223 households, and 1,367 families residing in the city. The racial makeup of the city was 96.73% White, 0.64% African American, 0.39% Native American, 0.39% Asian, 0.02% Pacific Islander, 1.01% from other races, and 0.83% from two or more races. Hispanic or Latino of any race were 1.98% of the population.

There were 2,223 households, out of which 30.2% had children under the age of 18 living with them, 50.3% were married couples living together, 8.3% had a female householder with no husband present, and 38.5% were non-families. 31.4% of all households were made up of individuals, and 12.6% had someone living alone who was 65 years of age or older. The average household size was 2.33 and the average family size was 2.96.

In the city, the population was spread out, with 24.1% under the age of 18, 16.4% from 18 to 24, 24.3% from 25 to 44, 19.7% from 45 to 64, and 15.4% who were 65 years of age or older. The median age was 34 years. For every 100 females, there were 88.9 males. For every 100 females age 18 and over, there were 84.6 males.

The median income for a household in the city was $34,615, and the median income for a family was $45,127. Males had a median income of $34,097 versus $21,706 for females. The per capita income for the city was $18,872. About 8.1% of families and 12.4% of the population were below the poverty line, including 7.3% of those under age 18 and 9.2% of those age 65 or over.

Government
Colby has a mayor-council form of government. Elected at-large, the mayor presides over the city council and has final approval over ordinances the council passes. The mayor shares responsibility for setting policy and approving the city budget with the council. With the council's consent, the mayor appoints all members of the city boards and, if necessary, serves as the tie-breaking vote on council business. The city council consists of eight members elected by ward every four years. The city manager is hired by the council and is responsible for preparing the budget, administering day-to-day operations, and managing city government personnel.

Education

Colleges and universities
 Colby Community College

Primary and secondary education
The community is served by Colby USD 315 public school district, and operates four public schools in the city:
 Colby High School (9-12).
 Colby Middle School (5-8).
 Colby Grade School (Grades K-4).
 Thomas County Academy (5-9), charter school.

There are also two private schools in Colby: 
 Sacred Heart Catholic School (Pre-K-5).
 Heartland Christian School (K-12).

Transportation
Interstate 70 runs east–west immediately south of Colby. U.S. Route 24 runs east–west through the city, intersecting K-25 which runs north–south.

Colby Municipal Airport is located on K-25 approximately 2 miles (3 km) north of the city.

Kyle Railroad operates rail via the former Rock Island Railroad which runs east–west through Colby. A Union Pacific Railroad branch line ends in Colby, entering the city from the southeast.

Media

The Colby Free Press is Colby's local newspaper, published four days a week. In addition, Colby Community College publishes a bi-weekly student newspaper, the Trojan Express.

Colby is a center of broadcast media for northwestern Kansas. One AM and four FM stations are licensed to and/or broadcast from the city. Colby is in the Wichita-Hutchinson television market, and two television stations broadcast from the city:  KLBY, a satellite of the ABC affiliate in Wichita, and KWKS, a satellite of Smoky Hills Public Television in Bunker Hill, Kansas.

Points of interest

The Prairie Museum of Art and History, 1905 S. Franklin St., serves as a cultural center. The museum is a private, nonprofit museum governed by the Thomas County Historical Society. The Society was founded in 1959 to preserve the history of Thomas County, Kansas. The museum occupies a  site just north of Interstate 70, between exits 53 and 54. The Cooper Barn located at the museum complex is known as the "Largest Barn in Kansas."

Thomas County Courthouse which was constructed in 1907 by local firms Holland, JC & Squires, Frank, Crosby, and L. & Son. It is currently listed on the National Register of Historic Places and is at 300 N. Court in Colby. Other city buildings joining the courthouse on the National Register of Historic Places include the Colby Community High School at 750 West 3rd St. (which is now used as an elementary/junior high school), and the art-deco sand-colored Colby City Hall, which was built in the 1920s by the architecture firm Suite & Blanchard. Throughout its 80-year history, the city-hall has served as a correctional facility, fire station, library and meeting hall.

Another feature of Colby is Villa High Lake. The city-made reservoir is situated on the South Side of Villa High Park, which was created in the 1960s by the Kansas Department of Wildlife and Parks. The park has playground equipment, picnic shelters, disc golf, and fishing.

Fike Park is located just north of City Hall at the intersection of Franklin Avenue and Eighth Street. The park area was formerly known as Carp Lake. The park has gazebos, a volleyball area, horseshoe pitching pits, and tennis courts. In 1998 and 1999, over $100,000 was raised by civic groups and parents, with assistance from the Kansas Department of Wildlife and Parks and the City of Colby, for new playground equipment. In 2000, the tennis courts in this area were replaced and are used by Colby Community College and Unified School District #315. Colby Swimming Pool was located just south of the park, but has since been converted into a parking lot.

Pioneer Memorial Library is at 375 W. 4th St., named in honor of the pioneers who built the community.

Colby Aquatic Park was opened in 2012 at 1610 S. Franklin, featuring a lazy river, lap pool, water slides and curly slides.

The Colby Event Center opened in July 2021. The facility features two gyms, meeting room space and indoor playground. The Event Center is home to all Colby High School and Colby Community College basketball and volleyball games.

In popular culture
Colby is mentioned in John Denver's 1974 song Matthew.

Notable people

Notable individuals who were born in and/or have lived in Colby include:

Mary Brooks (1907-2002), Director of the U.S. Mint
John Connelly (1870-1940), U.S. Representative from Kansas
Sheila Frahm (1945- ), U.S. Senator from Kansas, Lieutenant Governor of Kansas
Mike Hayden (1944- ), 41st Governor of Kansas
Zelma Henderson (1920-2008), school desegregation activist

Wayne Munn (1896-1931), professional wrestler
Samuel Ramey (1942- ), opera singer
Mark Schultz (1970- ), Contemporary Christian singer/songwriter
Ken Summers (1953- ), Colorado state legislator
John Thomas (1874-1945), U.S. Senator from Idaho
Carol Voisin (1947- ), Oregon politician

References

Further reading

External links

 City of Colby
 Colby - Directory of Public Officials
 Colby Chamber of Commerce
 Colby city map, KDOT

Cities in Thomas County, Kansas
Cities in Kansas
County seats in Kansas
Populated places established in 1885
1885 establishments in Kansas